The Vaijayanti is a mythological garland or elemental necklace, primarily associated with Vishnu. Employed in its worship as a garland, this object is also called the Vaijayantimala, or the Vanamala.

In Sri Vaishnava tradition, the poet-saint Thondaradippodi Alvar is regarded to be a manifestation of the Vanamala.

Literature 
Vaijayanti finds a mention in Vishnu Sahasranama, a stotram dedicated to Vishnu in the Mahabharata, as vanamali (forest flowers). 

The garland of victory is mentioned in the Mahabharata, as made of never-wilting lotuses. 

In the Skanda Purana, Varuna presents Lakshmi with the garland as a wedding gift.

According to the Vishnu Purana, the garland prominently displays five precious gemstones: emerald, sapphire, ruby, pearl, and diamond. These correspond with the five classic elements commonly named earth, water, fire, air, and ether respectively. 

In the Shiva Purana, Vishnu offers his garland to his son-in-law Kartikeya, before his battle with the asura Taraka.

The Garuda Purana includes a prayer known as the Vishnu Panjaram, which includes the following verse: "Taking up Vaijayanti and Srivatsa, the ornament of thy throat do thou protect me in the north-west, O god, O Hayagriva. I bow unto thee".

See also 

 Padma 
 Kaustubha
 Shaligrama

References 

Hindu mythology
Krishna
Vaishnavism
Sanskrit words and phrases
Flora of India (region)
Flowers in religion
Plants in Hinduism
Hindu worship